Hardin County High School is an American high school located in the city of Savannah, Tennessee.

References

External links 
 

Public high schools in Tennessee
Schools in Hardin County, Tennessee